A steephead valley, steephead or blind valley is a deep, narrow, flat bottomed valley with an abrupt ending.  Such closed valleys may arise in limestone or karst landscapes, where a layer of permeable rock lies above an impermeable substract such as marl.  Water flowing through a steephead valley leaves via one or more ponors or sinkholes.

Blind valleys are typically dry at their lower ends. If the ponor cannot contain the high runoff during a flood event an intermittent flow may continue through the valley beyond the sink.  Such a landform is called a  semi-blind or half-blind valley.

Development
They are created by a stream flowing within the permeable rock and eroding it from within, until the rock above collapses opening up a steep narrow valley which is then further eroded by the stream running across the impermeable valley floor.  At the head of the valley the stream emerges from the rock as a spring.  Notable examples can be found in the Jura region of France, for example the Reculée de Baume at Baume-les-Messieurs and the Reculée d'Arbois with its head at Les Planches-près-Arbois and its exit at Arbois.

In North America, blind valleys (the preferred American term) are found in the Driftless Area and other karst regions.

Examples
Tasghîmût
Gara Medouar

See also

Box canyon

References

Canyons and gorges
Geomorphology
Valleys